Case Closed: The Mirapolis Investigation, known in Japan as , is a video game for the Wii. It is based upon the popular anime and manga series Case Closed by Gosho Aoyama. Players use the Wii Remote to find clues and solve the cases.

Gameplay
Characters are designed in 3D models. During gameplay, the Wii Remote is used to solve cases in a point and click fashion (similar to games like Sam & Max and the Monkey Island series). There are times when Conan may be controlled as an actual character. There is an arcade mode where Conan travels around in an arcade where the players are able to play minigames.

Plot
The game follows Conan, Mouri, Ran, and The Junior Detective League as they are invited to the opening of a new hotel called The Mirapolis. But on the first day, someone is murdered. Now Conan must find out who did it.

References

External links
 

2007 video games
Mirapolis Investigation, The
Video games based on anime and manga
Video games developed in Japan
Video games set in hotels
Detective video games
Mystery video games
Wii games
Wii-only games
Single-player video games